is a retired Japanese artistic gymnast and Olympic medalist. She is the 2017 World Champion and 2021 World Champion on floor exercise, the 2018 World all-around silver medalist and floor exercise bronze medalist, and a four-time Japanese national all-around champion (2016–2018, 2020). She represented Japan at the 2016 and 2020 Olympics, winning a bronze medal on floor exercise in the latter. This made her the first female Japanese gymnast to win an individual medal at the Olympics.

Personal life 
Murakami was born in Sagamihara, Japan and began gymnastics when she was two years old. She attended university at the Nippon Sport Science University in Tokyo.

Career

2012-2013 
Murakami made her senior debut at the 2012 National Championships where she placed eleventh in the all-around. She was not named to the 2012 Olympic team. Murakami competed at the 2012 Stuttgart World Cup where Japan finished second to Russia.

Murakami competed at the 2013 City of Jesolo Trophy where she won bronze with the Japanese team and placed 22nd in the all-around. She finished third in the all-around at both the National Championships and the NHK Cup. She finished fourth on the floor exercise at the 2013 World Championships.

2014-2015 
Murakami competed at the 2014 Pacific Rim Gymnastics Championships placing fourth with the team, sixth on floor, seventh on bars and beam, and ninth in the all-around. She placed sixth in the all-around at the National Championships and fourth at the NHK Cup. At the All Japan Championships, she won gold on floor and silver on vault. She was then selected to compete at the 2014 World Championships along with Asuka Teramoto, Yu Minobe, Natsumi Sasada, Wakana Inoue, and Azumi Ishikura, and they finished in eighth place. After the World Championships Murakami finished the season by placed fifth in the all-around at the Glasgow World  and winning vault and floor at the Toyota International.

At the 2015 National Championships, Murakami struggled on beam and floor and placed tenth in the all-around. She placed eighth in the all-around at the NHK Cup, but at the Event Championships she won bronze on vault and gold on floor. Murakami was initially named an alternate for the World Championships, but an injury led to her joining the team. The Japanese team placed fifth, and she placed sixth in the all-around, the best finish by a Japanese woman in six years.

2016 
Murakami competed at the American Cup where she placed sixth in the all-around. She then won the all-around at the National Championships in addition to winning gold on floor and bronze on vault and beam. At the NHK Cup, she finished second in the all-around behind Asuka Teramoto, and she won gold on floor and silver on vault. At the Event National Championships, she won gold on floor exercise and placed fourth on uneven bars. She was then named to represent Japan at the 2016 Summer Olympics along with Asuka Teramoto, Aiko Sugihara, Yuki Uchiyama, and Sae Miyakawa.

2016 Summer Olympics 
Japan competed in the final subdivision of the qualification round, and they qualified seventh into the team final, and individually Murakami qualified ninth into the all-around and eighth on floor exercise. The team then finished fourth in the team final. Murakami placed fourteenth in the all-around final with a score of 56.665. She then placed seventh in the floor exercise final with a score of 14.533.

2017 
Murakami won the all-around at the National Championships in addition to winning gold on beam and floor and winning silver on vault. She also won the all-around at the NHK Cup and won gold on beam and floor and bronze on vault and uneven bars. She was then automatically named to the World Championship team along with Aiko Sugihara. She then won silver on floor and placed fifth on vault at the Event National Championships.
At the 2017 Artistic Gymnastics World Championships in Montreal, Quebec, Canada, she qualified first into the all-around final, ahead of American gymnast Ragan Smith, but had a fall in the finals, and ended up in 4th place, one-tenth of a point behind the bronze medalist, Russia's Elena Eremina. She redeemed herself in the floor exercise finals, where she placed first ahead of Jade Carey and Claudia Fragapane. She is Japan's first World gold medalist on this event, and Japan's second World gold medalist on any women's gymnastics event, after Keiko Tanaka-Ikeda won the gold on the balance beam in 1954. Afterward, she won gold on floor and bronze on vault at the Toyota International.

2018 
Murakami finished second at the American Cup behind Morgan Hurd. She then won the all-around at the Tokyo World Cup. Then, she won the all-around at both the National Championships and the NHK Cup. She won gold on balance beam and floor exercise at the Event National Championships. At the 2018 Artistic Gymnastics World Championships in Doha, Qatar the Japanese team finished in sixth place. Individually, she finished second in the all-around final, behind Simone Biles. It was the first women’s all-around silver medal in Japan’s history. She then won the bronze medal in the floor exercise final behind Biles and Morgan Hurd.

2019 
Murakami won a bronze medal in the all-around at the American Cup behind Americans Leanne Wong and Grace McCallum. Murakami missed the NHK Cup due to a back injury, but because of this, Murakami was deemed ineligible to make the Japanese team for the World Championships. Murakami's petition was denied.

2020-2021 
In February it was announced that Murakami would represent Japan at the Tokyo World Cup taking place on April 4.  However the event was cancelled due to the COVID-19 pandemic in Japan.  Murakami returned to competition in September at the All-Japan Senior Championships, where she won gold in the all-around. In addition, she performed well enough to win medals on each of the individual events, including two additional golds on vault and floor.  She next competed at the All-Japan Championships in December.

In April 2021, it was announced that she, along with Hatakeda Hitomi, Hiraiwa Yuna and Sugihara Aiko, would represent Japan at Tokyo 2020 Olympics. The team finished in 5th place and Murakami finished 5th in the all-around.

On 2 August 2021, Murakami achieved a score of 14.166 for the individual women's floor event and won bronze at the Tokyo 2020 Olympics (tied with Angelina Melnikova of ROC who also won bronze).  She became the first female Japanese gymnast to win an individual medal at the Olympics. This was also only the second time that Japan had won an Olympic medal on any women's gymnastics event, since finishing 3rd in the team competition at the 1964 Olympics which were also held in Tokyo.

In October 2021, Murakami competed at the 2021 World Championships, where she won gold on the floor exercise and bronze on the balance beam. After this achievement, she announced her retirement from gymnastics.

Competitive history

References

External links 
 

1996 births
Living people
Japanese female artistic gymnasts
Gymnasts at the 2016 Summer Olympics
Olympic gymnasts of Japan
World champion gymnasts
Medalists at the World Artistic Gymnastics Championships
Gymnasts at the 2020 Summer Olympics
Medalists at the 2020 Summer Olympics
Olympic medalists in gymnastics
Olympic bronze medalists for Japan
Nippon Sport Science University alumni
21st-century Japanese women